Cane River (Rivière aux Cannes) is a  river formed from a portion of the Red River that is located in Natchitoches Parish, Louisiana. In the 19th and 20th centuries, it has been best known as the site of a historic Creole de couleur (multiracial) culture that has centers upon the National Historic Landmark Melrose Plantation and nearby St. Augustine Church.

In 1836 the Red River shifted to the eastward channel which was called the "Rigolette de Bon Dieu".

References

Rivers of Louisiana
C
Rivers of Natchitoches Parish, Louisiana
Tributaries of the Red River of the South
Natchitoches, Louisiana